As-Suwaydi (1204–1292, AH 604–690, full name ‘Izz al-Dīn Abū Isḥāq Ibrāhīm ibn Muḥammad ibn Ṭarkhān as-Suwaydī ) was a medieval Arab physician from the Aws tribe, and a pupil of Ibn al-Baytar. Active in Cairo and Damascus, he compiled three works:   a treatise on plant names, a treatise on the medical use of stones, and a book of medical recipes and procedures (Tadhkirah).
As-Suwaydi's Tadhkirah was epitomized by Shaʿrānī in the 16th century.

References

 C. Brockelmann, Geschichte der arabischen Litteratur (1st edition  1889-1936, 2nd edition 1943-49) vol. 1  p. 493 (2nd ed. p. 650), no. 38.
 C. Brockelmann, Geschichte der arabischen Litteratur, Supplement (Leiden: Brill, 1937-1942), vol. 1, p. 900 no. 38.
 Manfred Ullmann, "Die Medizin im Islam" in: Handbuch der Orientalistik, (Leiden: E.J. Brill, 1970),  Abteilung I, Ergänzungsband vi, Abschnitt 1,  p. 284.

External links
US National Library of Medicine

Pharmacologists of the medieval Islamic world
1204 births
1292 deaths
Medieval Syrian physicians
13th-century Arabs